Vanessa Saraí Ovando Monroy (born 17 May 1990) is a Guatemalan retired footballer who played as a midfielder. She has been a member of the Guatemala women's national team.

International career
Ovando represented Guatemala at the 2010 CONCACAF Women's U-20 Championship. At senior level, she capped during the 2010 CONCACAF Women's World Cup Qualifying (and its qualification).

References

1990 births
Living people
Guatemalan women's footballers
Guatemala women's international footballers
Women's association football midfielders
Guatemalan women's futsal players